Liothorax plagiatus is a beetle in the subfamily Aphodiinae. It was described by Carl Linnaeus in 1767. It occurs in Europe, the Near East, and North Africa. It has no known subspecies according to the Catalogue of Life. It is saprophagous rather than a "true" dung beetle.

References 

Scarabaeidae
Beetles of North Africa
Beetles of Asia
Beetles of Europe
Taxa named by Carl Linnaeus